Mourera is a genus of flowering plants belonging to the family Podostemaceae.

Its native range is Southern Tropical America.

Species:

Mourera alcicornis 
Mourera aspera 
Mourera elegans 
Mourera fluviatilis 
Mourera glazioviana 
Mourera monadelpha 
Mourera schwackeana 
Mourera weddelliana

References

Podostemaceae
Malpighiales genera